The Dali–Lijiang Expressway (p Dàlǐ–Lìjiāng Gāosù Gōnglù), commonly referred to as the  (Dàlǐ Gāosù Gōnglù) and designated as the G5611, is a  Chinese expressway in that province of Yunnan that connects the tourist city of Lijiang with the Hangrui Expressway (G56) running between Kunming and the Burmese border. It officially opened on 30 December 2013.

The Dali Expressway does not connect to Dali proper but to Xiaguan ("New Dali"), the major industrial city within Dali County. Dali is connected to both ends of the expressway via Hwy 214.

References

Chinese national-level expressways
Expressways in Yunnan